Riverside Medical Center is a 300-bed teaching hospital located in Kankakee, Illinois. The hospital operates a Level II Trauma Center and a primary stroke center. The hospital provides inpatient acute care and outpatient services. Founded in 1964, the hospital is a part of Riverside Healthcare. 

The hospital operates a number of residency training and fellowship programs for newly graduated physicians. The residencies train physicians specializing in psychiatry and internal medicine, and the fellowships train physicians specializing in cardiology, interventional cardiology and gastroenterology.

On March 19, 2020, the first case of COVID-19 infection in Kankakee was reported at Riverside Medical Center. The following month, the hospital began onsite testing for COVID-19 infection.

References

External links
 Riverside Medical Center

Hospital networks in the United States
Healthcare in Illinois
Kankakee, Illinois
Medical and health organizations based in Illinois
1964 establishments in Illinois
Hospitals established in 1964
Emergency services in Illinois
Teaching hospitals in Illinois